Una Mulzac (April 19, 1923 – January 21, 2012) was an African American bookseller and founder of the Liberation Bookstore, a prominent African-American bookstore specializing in political and Black Power materials and was located in Harlem.

Personal life
Una Mulzac was born in Baltimore, but raised in Brooklyn, New York. Her father, Hugh Mulzac, was a socialist and the first black commander of a ship in the United States Merchant Marine. She grew up in Bedford–Stuyvesant, where she graduated from Girls' High School. Mulzac briefly worked as a secretary for Random House. In 1963, Mulzac moved to British Guiana, where she joined the People's Progressive Party and ran their bookstore in the capital of Georgetown. She was injured in a bomb attack at the Progressive Book Store. Mulzac was on the executive board of the Harlem chapter of the NAACP. Her grand nephew is Sharrif Simmons, a poet and songwriter.

Liberation Bookstore 

A year after to returning to Harlem from British Guiana, Mulzac opened the Liberation Bookstore in 1967. The Liberation Bookstore has been compared to Lewis Michaux's African National Memorial Bookstore.

Further reading
Joshua Clark Davis. From Head Shops to Whole Foods: The Rise and Fall of Activist Entrepreneurs. Columbia University Press, 2017, 
Joshua Clark Davis, "Una Mulzac, Black Woman Booksellers, and Pan-Africanism," Black Perspectives, September 19, 2016.
Sharifa Rhodes-Pitts, Harlem Is Nowhere: A Journey to the Mecca of Black America, Little Brown, 2011, .

Notes

External links

 Jacob McKean, "Last Chapter Draws Near at Mainstay Harlem Bookstore", Columbia Spectator, October 31, 2003.

1923 births
2012 deaths
American booksellers
American people of Saint Vincent and the Grenadines descent
American people of Jamaican descent
Businesspeople from Baltimore
African-American businesspeople
Businesspeople from New York City
20th-century American businesspeople
Girls' High School alumni
People from Bedford–Stuyvesant, Brooklyn
20th-century American businesswomen
20th-century African-American women
20th-century African-American people
21st-century African-American people
21st-century African-American women